Əmirxanlı may refer to: 
Əmirxanlı, Shabran, Azerbaijan
Aşağı Əmirxanlı, Azerbaijan
Əmirxanlı, Zangilan, Azerbaijan